Charokee Young (born 21 August 2000) is a track and field athlete from Jamaica.

Career
Young came third in the Jamaican national championships over 400 metres in 2022. At the 2022 World Athletics Championships in Eugene, Oregon Young qualified from the heats for the semi finals in the 400 meters where she placed 16th in 51.41 and ran in the 4 x 400 metres relay in which the team won the silver medal.

NCAA
Charokee Young is a 2-time NCAA Division 1 champion, former collegiate outdoor 4x400 m relay record holder, 9-time NCAA Division 1 All-American sprinter & Southeastern Conference Champion.

References

2000 births
Living people
World Athletics Championships athletes for Jamaica
World Athletics Championships medalists
Jamaican female sprinters
21st-century Jamaican women